Yusefkhan Kandi (also Romanized as Yūsefkhān Kandī; also known as (Yūsef Kandī) is a village in Arshaq-e Gharbi Rural District, Moradlu District, Meshgin Shahr County, Ardabil Province, Iran. At the 2006 census, its population was 124, in 33 families.

References 

Towns and villages in Meshgin Shahr County